Crocallis is a genus of moths in the family Geometridae erected by Georg Friedrich Treitschke in 1825.

Species
 Crocallis albarracina Wehrli, 1940
 Crocallis auberti Oberthür, 1883
 Crocallis bacalladoi
 Crocallis boisduvaliaria (H. Lucas, 1849)
 Crocallis dardoinaria Donzel, 1840 – dusky scalloped oak
 Crocallis elinguaria (Linnaeus, 1758) – scalloped oak
 Crocallis friedrichi
 Crocallis inexpectata Warnecke, 1940
 Crocallis matillae
 Crocallis mirabica Brandt, 1941
 Crocallis pototskii Viidalepp, 1988
 Crocallis rjabovi Wehrli, 1936
 Crocallis tusciaria (Borkhausen, 1793)

References

Ennomini